District Line is the seventh solo album from former Hüsker Dü and Sugar frontman Bob Mould.

Returning from his previous solo album, Body of Song, are drummer Brendan Canty, of Fugazi fame, and cellist Amy Domingues. Mould handled all of the other instruments himself.

The closer, "Walls in Time," is actually a track that failed to make his 1989 solo debut, Workbook.

Release
"The Silence Between Us" was released as a single on January 8, 2008. District Line was released on February 5, 2008; Mould promoted it with a US tour in the following month. Following this, he appeared at the Pukkelpop festival.

Track listing
All songs written by Bob Mould.

"Stupid Now" – 4:06
"Who Needs to Dream" – 3:57
"Again and Again" – 5:21
"Old Highs New Lows" – 4:00
"Return to Dust" – 4:24
"The Silence Between Us" – 3:34
"Shelter Me" – 3:53
"Very Temporary" – 3:11
"Miniature Parade" – 3:34
"Walls in Time" – 6:12

Personnel
Bob Mould – vocals, guitar, bass, keyboards, percussion, programming
Brendan Canty – drums, additional engineering
Amy Domingues – cello
Technical
Frank Marchand – recording
Jim Wilson – mastering
Brett Marden – artwork
Peter Ross – portrait

Charts

References

2008 albums
Anti- (record label) albums
Bob Mould albums
Albums produced by Bob Mould